Khaled El-Khaled (born 6 May 1951) is a Syrian former wrestler who competed in the 1980 Summer Olympics.

References

1951 births
Living people
Olympic wrestlers of Syria
Wrestlers at the 1980 Summer Olympics
Syrian male sport wrestlers
Place of birth missing (living people)
20th-century Syrian people